is the fifteenth studio album by Japanese rock band Buck-Tick. It was released on September 19, 2007, through BMG Records. The limited edition came with a DVD of the music videos for the singles "Rendezvous" and "Alice in Wonder Underground". Tenshi no Revolver peaked at number five on the Oricon chart with 23,114 copies sold. For the album Buck-Tick went for a "band sound," the sound of an ordinary straight rock band.

Track listing

Personnel
 Atsushi Sakurai - lead vocals
 Hisashi Imai - lead guitar, backing vocals
 Hidehiko Hoshino - rhythm guitar, backing vocals
 Yutaka Higuchi - bass
 Toll Yagami - drums

Additional performers
 Kazutoshi Yokoyama - keyboards
 Katsushige Okazaki - timpani
 Selia - counter tenor on "Mr. Darkness & Mrs. Moonlight" and "Revolver"
 Mio Okamura - violin on "Rain" and "Snow White"

Production
 Hitoshi Hiruma - producer, mixing, recording
 Shigenobu Karube - executive producer
 Kenichi Arai; Mikiro Yamada - engineers
 Yosuke Watanabe; Kiyoko Asai; Seiji Toda - assistant engineers
 Tim Young - mastering
 Ken Sakaguchi - art direction
 Kishin Shinoyama - cover art, photography
 Mitsuaki Koshizuka; Hiroshi Harada - additional photography

References

Buck-Tick albums
2007 albums
Bertelsmann Music Group albums
Japanese-language albums